Legal Crime is an online real-time strategy video game from Finnish studio Byte Enchanters.

Development
The game was in development for two and a half years.

Reception

Computer Games Magazine gave the game a score of 4 out of 5 stating"If you’ve burned out on the RTS game du’ jour and are looking for a change then give Legal Crime a whirl. Perhaps you’ll rise through the ranks to head your own family, and manage to claw your way to the top of ladder…then again you might just get gunned down in the street…either way it’s fun"

References

1997 video games
Organized crime video games
Video games developed in Finland